The Musée Cantini is a museum in Marseilles that has been open to the public since 1936. The museum specializes in modern art, especially paintings from the first half of the twentieth century.

The building 
The musée Cantini building was built in 1694 for the Compagnie du Cap Nègre. The company ran into financial difficulties and the building was sold in 1709  to Dominique de Montgrand great-grandfather of Jean-Baptiste-Jacques-Guy-Thérèse de Montgrand, future Mayor of Marseille.
The building was then sold to Louis Joseph Chaudoin in 1801 and to Dieudonné Bernadac in 1816. In 1888, it was acquired by Jules Cantini who bequeathed it to the City of Marseille in 1916, with the stipulation that it was to become a museum of decorative arts. The museum was opened in 1936.

The Collection 

The Musée Cantini has one of the largest public collections in France of the 1900-1960 period. A wide variety of artists is represented, including Charles Camoin, Raoul Dufy, Albert Gleizes, Henri Laurens, Wassily Kandinsky, František Kupka, Jean Hélion, Alberto Magnelli, Amédée Ozenfant, Max Ernst, André Masson, Simon Simon-Auguste, Jacques Thévenet, Victor Brauner, Joan Miró, Jean Arp.

Pointillisme, fauvisme et cubisme 
 Paul Signac, La Corne d'or, Matin, 1907 et Entrée du Port de Marseille, 1918
 André Derain, Pinède, Cassis, 1907
 Raoul Dufy, Landscapes of l'Estaque, 1908
 Albert Gleizes, L'Ecolier and Etude pour Femme assise, c.1920
 Emile Othon Friesz, Auguste Chabaud, Charles Camoin, Alfred Lombard

Inter-War Period 
 Oskar Kokoschka, Le port de Marseille, 1925
 Jean Hélion, Composition verticale, 1936
 Alberto Magnelli, Pierres n°2, 1932
 Jeanne-Laure Garcin, Les Hommes et la machine, 1932
 Julio Gonzalez, Danseuse à la palette, vers 1934
 Wassily Kandinsky, František Kupka, Jacques Villon ...

Surrealism 
 Max Ernst, Monument aux oiseaux, 1927
 Jacques Hérold, Les Têtes, 1939
 André Masson, Antille, 1943, Le Terrier, 1946
 Jean Arp, Genèse, 1944
 Joseph Cornell, Flat sand box, vers 1950
 Roberto Matta, Contra vosotros asesinos de palomas, 1950
 Wifredo Lam, Francis Picabia, Victor Brauner ...

From World War II to 1980 
 Pablo Picasso, Tête de femme souriante, 1943;
 Fernand Léger, Nature morte au couteau, 1945;
 Nicolas de Staël, Harmonie rouge, bleue et noire, 1951;
 Alberto Giacometti, Portrait de Diego, 1957;
 Roland Bierge, Nature morte à la Théière brune, 1957;
 Balthus, Nature morte à la lampe, 1958, Le Baigneur, 1960;
 Jean Dubuffet, Vénus du trottoir, 1946, Brouette en surplomb I, 1964;
 Francis Bacon, Autoportrait, 1976;
 Antonin Artaud, Vieira da Silva...
 Jean-Charles Blais, s.t, huile sur bois et collage, 1986;

Drawings 
The museum has drawings by André Derain, Pierre Bonnard, André Masson, Francis Picabia, Mark Rothko, Pablo Picasso, Edward Hopper, Victor Brauner, Jean Dubuffet...

Degas theft 

In 2009 the museum was exhibiting Edgar Degas's pastel on monotype Les Choristes, on loan from the Musée d'Orsay in Paris. It was stolen at the end of the year; the investigation went cold until 2018, when customs officers recovered it from the luggage compartment of a bus outside Paris.

Bibliography 
 Régis Bertrand, Lucien Tirone, Le guide de Marseille, édition la manufacture, Besançon, 1991,

References

External links
 Musée Cantini

Art museums and galleries in France
Museums in Marseille
FRAME Museums
1936 establishments in France